Line 5 of the Beijing Subway is Beijing's only subway line with an entirely north-south route. Line 5's color is maroon. It entered into operation on October 7, 2007. Though Line 4 and Line 8 also broadly follow north-south routes (and so, in part, do Lines 14 and 13), Line 5 remains the only line to follow an almost entirely straight north-south course. Line 5 is also notable for including three stations in the densely populated northern suburb of Tiantongyuan, as well as providing convenient access to the Temple of Earth and Temple of Heaven. Since Line 5 connects with Line 1, Line 2 (twice), Line 6, Line 7, Line 10 (twice), Line 13, Line 14 and Line 15, and also links densely populated suburbs directly to the city center, it tends to experience very crowded conditions during rush hour and even very late into the evening. Over 1 million passengers use the line every weekday in 2019.

Hours of Operation
The first south-bound trains departs from Tiantongyuan North at 4:59am. The first north-bound train departs from Songjiazhuang at 5:19am. The last south-bound train leaves Tiantongyuan North at 10:47pm. The last north-bound train leaves Songjiazhuang at 11:10pm. For the official timetable, see.

Route

Line 5 runs in a North-South direction, beginning with three stations in the northern suburb of Tiantongyuan in Changping District, about  outside the 5th Ring Road. At , it connects with Line 15. At , it links up with Line 10 Loop. Then Line 5 cuts through the old areas of Dongcheng District. It takes 49 minutes to cover all the 23 stations.

Stations (North to South)
●: stop

▲: some SB PM peak trains skip

▼: some NB PM peak trains skip

Technology
Line 5 is the first subway line in Beijing to have platform screen doors in underground stations and automatic platform gates in elevated stations that prevent riders from falling onto the tracks. Line 5 stations also have LCD screens that display the wait times for the next train. Line 5 trains have digital voice announcements (in Mandarin and English) and LCD passenger information displays.

History
Construction work on Line 5 got underway in late 2002 and the line opened to the public on October 7, 2007.

Timeline

 December 28, 2002: Construction on Line 5 began.
 March 28, 2004: Tunneling started underneath Yonghegong Lama Temple and Hepingli Beijie stations, marking the start of Line 5 construction in urban Beijing. The tunnel would pass the Temple of Heaven.
 May 20, 2004: The tunnel between Yonghegong Lama Temple and Zhangzizhonglu stations broke through.
 November 11, 2005: Railway tracks were laid at Huixinxijie Beikou station.
 July 2006: The entire underground railway was completed.
 September 2006: Platform screen doors began installation in Line 5 stations.
 April 2007: Line 5 started trial runs without passengers.
 October 7, 2007: Line 5 opened to the public at 2p.m.
 November 23, 2007: Sound insulation were installed on the elevated parts of Line 5 following complaints of excess noise from nearby residents.

Rolling Stock

References

Beijing Subway lines
Beijing Subway, Line 5
2007 establishments in China
750 V DC railway electrification